Bob Jenyns (born Robert Jenyns, 1944, Victoria) is a prolific Australian artist whose practice, spanning over four decades, has produced countless sculptures, prints, drawings, and paintings.  He has participated in many of Australia's most significant art exhibitions including the first Biennale of Sydney (1973), the 1973, 1975 and 1978 Mildura Sculpture Triennials, the 1981 Australian Perspecta, the 2nd Australian Sculpture Biennale, and the 1990 Sculpture Triennial. Jenyns was a finalist in the 2006 Helen Lempriere National Sculpture Award, and in 2007 won the award with his work Pont de l'archeveche. He is represented in many of the country's largest collections, including the National Gallery of Australia, the Art Gallery of New South Wales, the Queensland Art Gallery, the Museum of Contemporary Art in Brisbane, and the Tasmanian Museum and Art Gallery.  Jenyns has also received multiple grants from the Australia Council's Visual Arts Board, has curated exhibitions and has taught at the Tasmanian School of Art as head of the sculpture department (1982–2005).

Bob Jenyns is married to ceramic artist Lorraine Jenyns.  Both live and work in Tasmania, Australia. He died on 6 November 2015.

Style 
Jenyns' work is distinctive in style, which has remained relatively consistent throughout his lengthy artistic career.  His art is identifiable by his persistent use of figuration, his use of a naive or Outsider Aesthetic, distinct sense of humour, a handcrafted aesthetic, the tableaux or narrative as artistic strategies, the celebration of the everyday and the frequent reference to political, cultural and social events as well as personal experience.

A Naive Aesthetic 
Of the few critics that have written on Jenyns, most refer to the 'naive' or Outsider Aesthetic evident in his work.  James Gleeson in 1973, for instance, labelled Jenyns as 'pop-naive'; and Bernice Murphy believes that Jenyns' approach to form 'is allied to tribal art or direct vernacular forms in popular culture, rather than to the formal tradition of Western sculpture.' Graeme Sturgeon believes that this aesthetic 'suggests that Jenyns is a naive artist viewing everything with an apparently wide-eyed innocence.' However, all agree that this exterior is deceptive, with Sturgeon adding that 'one suspects, that behind the apparently ingenuous exterior… there lies another, more profound reality, which will be well worth discovering.' Under Jenyns' profile in Australian Sculptors, Ken Scarlett acknowledges that

His work certainly has the appearance of naivety, but it also contains a sophisticated wit … Is the sculptor really naive?  Is he pulling the spectator's leg? Is he making fun of art and the whole gallery scene?

Jenyns' enthusiastic embrace of the Outsider Aesthetic appears to stem from a number of different experiences and sources.  Firstly, his childhood experience of making toys out of salvaged materials has subsequently affected his treatment of materials and form later in his professional artistic career.  Secondly, Jenyns has long held an interest in Folk, Naive and outsider art, which has also clearly influenced his style.  Lastly, his use of the Outsider Aesthetic serves as a strategy in order to express his disapproval of certain aspects of the art establishment.  For Jenyns, the Outsider Aesthetic is symbolic of individual expression, and is a way of challenging dictated notions of taste and high art.

Humour 

In Jenyns' art, humour exists in a number of different forms.  His titles often include puns (such as Putting Money Where Your Mouse Is (1967)), and his subjects are parodied (for example Humble Hero (c. 1984)), although generally in a good-humoured manner.  His clever observations of social, political and cultural structures, and celebration of everyday objects and events, are humorously captured in his work, and the many works which celebrate these easily forgotten moments of life are amusing simply due to their banality (Dog (1993)).  Satire is mostly used by Jenyns in a subtle manner, emerging in quietly subversive works that hide behind a naive exterior; however, occasionally Jenyns produces blatantly critical works which use ironic humour to air political or cultural disapproval (Meanwhile... Down South in Tasmania (2005)).  Additionally, his novel use of materials and techniques to produce works of art regularly undermine traditional notions of high and low art.

Representation 
Jenyns was represented by Watters Gallery in Sydney before its closure.

He is represented in Hobart by Colville Street Gallery.

Collections 

Jenyns has artwork held in the following collections:

Alice Springs Art Foundation
Art Gallery of Ballarat
Art Gallery of New South Wales
Family Court Collection, Canberra
Deakin University, Geelong
Geelong Art Gallery
Federation University Art Collection
Heide Park and Art Gallery
ICI Collection, Melbourne
Kelvin Grove Teacher's College, Brisbane
National Gallery of Australia, Canberra
Museum of Contemporary Art, Brisbane
New England Regional Art Museum
Queen Victoria Museum & Art Gallery, Launceston
Queensland Art Gallery
Tasmanian Museum & Art Gallery
University of Tasmania
Visual Arts Board Collection

Images of Bob Jenyns' work 

For images of Jenyns' work refer to the following pages:
Colville Street Gallery , Hobart
Watters Gallery , Sydney
Helen Lempriere National Sculpture Award
Prints and Printmaking: Australia Asia Pacific

Notes

References 

Belgiorno-Nettis, Franco. '1973 Founding Governor's Report.' Biennale of Sydney, retrieved 15 August 2007, http://www.biennaleofsydney.com.au/history/1973
Colville Street Gallery. 'Bob Jenyns.' Colville Street Gallery, Hobart, https://web.archive.org/web/20081120003104/http://www.colvillestreetartgallery.com.au/gallery/bobjenyns.php
Drury, Nevill. (ed) New Art Two: New Directions in Contemporary Australian Art, Sydney: Craftsman House, 1988.
Germaine, Max. Artists and Galleries of Australia and New Zealand, Sydney: Lansdowne, 1979.
Hutchinson, Noel. 'Sculpturscape '73.' Art and Australia, vol. 11, no. 1, 1973, pp. 76–86
Lindsay, Robert. Field to Figuration: Australian Art 1960-1986, Melbourne: National Gallery of Victoria, 1986.
McCulloch, Alan. Encyclopaedia of Australian Art, Melbourne: Hutchinson, 1984.
McCulloch, Sandra. Encyclopaedia of Australian Art, 2nd ed. Sydney: Allen and Unwin, 1994.
Murphy, Bernice. Australian Perspecta 1981, [catalogue] Sydney: Art Gallery of New South Wales, 1981.
National Gallery of Australia. 'Prints and Printmaking.' National Gallery of Australia (Australian Prints), Canberra, https://web.archive.org/web/20081228032021/http://www.printsandprintmaking.gov.au/Default.aspx?
Scarlett, Ken. Australian Sculptors, Melbourne: Nelson, 1980.
Scarlett, Ken. 'Australian Humour – Australian Sculpture.' Artlink, vol. 13, no. 2, 1993, pp. 29–31
Sculpturscape '73. Sculpturscape '73: An Exhibition in Mildura Australia, Mildura: Mildura Arts Centre, 1973.
Sturgeon, Graeme. Australian Sculpture Now: Second Australian Sculpture Triennial, [catalogue essay] Melbourne: National Gallery of Victoria, 1984.
Sturgeon, Graeme. Sculpture at Mildura: The Story of the Mildura Sculpture Triennial, 1961–1982, Mildura: Mildura City Council, 1985.
Tasmanian Museum and Art Gallery. 'Sea: Maritime Treasures from the Tasmanian Museum and Art Gallery.' Tasmanian Museum and Art Gallery, https://web.archive.org/web/20081123031442/http://www.tmag.tas.gov.au/sea/seacat04.htm

20th-century Australian sculptors
1944 births
Living people
21st-century Australian sculptors